An Eidophor was a video projector used to create theater-sized images from an analog video signal. The name Eidophor is derived from the Greek word-roots eido and phor meaning 'image' and 'bearer' (carrier). Its basic technology was the use of electrostatic charges to deform an oil surface.

Origins and use
The idea for the original Eidophor was conceived in 1939 in Zurich by Swiss physicist Fritz Fischer, professor at the Labor für technische Physik of the Swiss Federal Institute of Technology, with the first prototype being unveiled in 1943. A basic patent was filed on November 8, 1939, in Switzerland and granted by the United States Patent and Trademark Office (patent no. 2,391,451) to Friederich Ernst Fischer for the Process and appliance for projecting television pictures on 25 December 1945.
During the Second World War, Edgar Gretener worked together with Fischer at the Institute of Technical Physics to develop a prototype. When Gretener launched his own company Dr. Edgar Gretener AG in 1941 to develop enciphering equipment for the Swiss army, he stopped working on Eidophor. Hugo Thiemann took over this responsibility at the ETH. After six years of work on this project at the ETH, Thiemann moved together with the project to the company Dr. Edgar Gretener AG, which was licensed by the ETH to further develop Eidophor, following Fischer's death in 1947.
An original August 1952 magazine article in the Radio and Television News credits the development of the Eidophor to Edgar Gretener.   
     
Following the Second World War, a first demonstration of an Eidophor system as a cinema video projector was organized in the Cinema Theater REX in Zurich to show successfully a TV broadcast in April 1958. An even more promising perspective was the interest of
Paramount Pictures and 20th Century Fox which experimented with the concept of "theatre television", where television images would be broadcast onto cinema screens. Over 100 cinemas were set up for the project, which failed because of financial losses and the refusal of the U.S. Federal Communications Commission (FCC) to grant theatre owners their own UHF bands for presentation.

Eidophors used an optical system somewhat similar to a conventional movie projector, but substituted a slowly rotating mirrored disk or dish for the film. The disk was covered with a thin film of transparent high-viscosity oil, and through the use of a scanned electron beam, electrostatic charges could be deposited onto the oil, causing its surface to deform. Light was shone on the disc by a striped mirror consisting of strips of reflective material alternating with transparent non-reflective areas. Areas of the oil unaffected by the electron beam would allow the light to be reflected directly back to the mirror and towards the light source, whereas light passing through deformed areas would be displaced and would pass through the adjacent transparent areas and onwards through the projection system. As the disk rotated, a doctor blade discharged and smoothed the ripples in the oil, readying it for re-use on another television frame.

The Eidophor was a large and cumbersome device and not commonly used until there was a need for good-quality large-screen projection. This opportunity arose as part of the NASA space program, where the technology was deployed in mission control.

Eidophors were also used in stadiums by touring music groups for live event visual amplification.

Simple Eidophors produced black-and-white images. Later units used a color wheel (equivalent to the color television standard CBS tried to bring to the market against RCA/NBC's FCC-approved NTSC system, and today's DLP projection system) to produce red, green, and blue fields. The last models produced used separate red, green, and blue units in a single case. The Eidophor was 80 times brighter than CRT projectors of the time. The last Eidophors were able to project colour images of up to 18 metres in width.

Advances in projection television technology in the 1990s brought about the end of the Eidophor. An early prototype of a new type of projector with limited resolution using a passive matrix-addressed liquid-crystal display was shown at a conference in San Francisco by Swiss engineer Peter J. Wild already in 1972. The new devices, using active matrix addressing of LCDs were smaller and cheaper and produced results comparable with Eidophor. Current technologies include liquid-crystal display (LCD) and digital light processing (DLP) projectors, both of which produce superior results from easily portable devices.

See also
 Comparison of display technology
 Talaria projector
 Telecinema
 Closed-circuit television

Notes

References
Robertson, A. (1976) Projection Techniques:TV, pp. 149–150, in Video Year Book 1977, Poole, The Dolphin Press.
Johannes, Heinrich (1989) The History of the EIDOPHOR Large-Screen Television Projector, GRETAG AG, Regensdorf, Switzerland
Meyer, Caroline (2009) Der Eidophor: Ein Grossbildprojektionssystem zwischen Kino und Fernsehen 1939–1999. (Interferenzen – Studien zur Kulturgeschichte der Technik, 15). Chronos-Verlag, Zurich 2009, .

External links
 The history and workings of Eidophor projection
 August, 1952 issue of Radio & Television Newsmagazine article discussing Eidophors
 Eidophor: 1950's Steampunk Video Projection Technology, presentation by Mike Harrison at the 2016 Hackaday Belgrade conference 
 Make It Better Than Just Being There, 1992 Eidophor promotional film, hosted by the Museum for Communication

Projectors
Television technology
Swiss inventions